Mark Herberholz is an American Magic: The Gathering player. He is best known for winning Pro Tour Honolulu in 2006, and for designing the Heezy-street deck he used to win the tournament. More recently, Herberholz has attracted attention for his deck designs in collaboration with Gabriel Nassif and Patrick Chapin. He appeared on The Price Is Right on December 9, 2005 and won $5,850 in cash and prizes.

Achievements

References

Living people
American Magic: The Gathering players
Year of birth missing (living people)
People from Novi, Michigan